Jeroen Krupa (born 26 April 2003) is a German professional footballer who plays as a forward for FC Ingolstadt II.

References

External links

2003 births
Living people
German footballers
Association football forwards
1. FC Kaiserslautern players
FC Ingolstadt 04 players
FC Ingolstadt 04 II players
2. Bundesliga players
Bayernliga players